The Scout Association of Jamaica, the national Scouting organisation of Jamaica, was founded in 1910, and became a member of the World Organization of the Scout Movement in 1963. The coeducational Scout Association of Jamaica has 2,539 members in 18 districts as of 2011. 

In 1952, The First Caribbean Jamboree was held in Jamaica.

In 1965, Jamaica's Leslie R. Mordecai was awarded the Bronze Wolf, the only distinction of the World Organization of the Scout Movement, awarded by the World Scout Committee for exceptional services to world Scouting. Other honorees include Donald A. Fitz-Ritson in 1973.

Community service is a major part of Jamaican Scouting. There are camps held for disadvantaged youngsters, literacy campaigns, cleanups, tree planting and relief work during natural disasters. 

The Governor General of Jamaica, Sir Patrick Allen is now the Chief Scout of Jamaica. Sir Patrick was invested by the Scout Association of Jamaica at a ceremony at King's House on September 4, 2009. Mr. Carlton Thompson is the International Commissioner of the Scout Association of Jamaica.

History
1910- Scouting came to Jamaica with the first troop being started in Brown's Town, St. Ann, by the Rev. J.W. Graham.
1911 - First troop to be formed in Kingston was started by Mr. Harry Mills. Mr. D. L. Stephenson started Wolmer's Boys' School Troop.
1912 - First St. Catherine troop started by Mr. F.H. Messias in Spanish Town. Lord Robert Baden-Powell, who was then the Commonwealth Chief Scout, visited Jamaica. It was on his voyage to Jamaica that he met his wife, Olave Soames.
1913 - Jamaica Branch of the Boy Scout Association was registered. Captain Langley became the first Island Commissioner. The Island Camp was held at Clovelly Park on what are now the grounds of Kingston College.
1920 - The Association became the Boy Scout Association of Jamaica.
1925 - A contingent of Scouts from Jamaica was sent to the Olympia Jamboree in England, and has had representatives at every World Jamboree since then.
1952 - Jamaica hosted the first Caribbean Jamboree at Briggs Park (now Up Park Camp).
1958 - The Scout Headquarters was established at its present address, 2d Camp Road, Kingston. Scout Headquarters was established at its present address, 2d Camp Road, Kingston. Prior to this the headquarters was housed on the Doncaster Lands, by the sea in Kingston. 
1977 - 6th Caribbean Jamboree was held at UWI, Mona, Jamaica
1985 - Fifth Pan American Jamboree was held in Jamaica ( G.C. Foster College)
2006 - Jamaica hosted the 13th Caribbean Jamboree (Natures Way, Portland)
2019 - Jamaica hosted the 15th Caribbean Cuboree (Ocho Rios, St. Ann)

Leaders
The Boy Scout Association of Jamaica had three Island Commissioners:
1932 - Noel Crosswell
1940 - Mr. H.D. Tucker
1949 - Mr. D.S. A. Fitz-Ritson

While Mr. Fitz-Ritson was in office the title "Island Commissioner" was changed to "Chief Commissioner" and since then there have been seven Chief Commissioners: 
1979 - Mr. James Lloyd
1979 - Brig. Dunstan Robinson
1986 - Mr. Vincent Rose
1994 - Mr. Richard Chambers
1998 - Dr Edward Lee
Stanford Davis
2007 - Rev. Barrington Soares
2013 - Mr. Maurice A. Brown

See also
 Scouting in Jamaica

References

World Organization of the Scout Movement member organizations
Scouting and Guiding in Jamaica

Youth organizations established in 1910
1910 establishments in Jamaica